Community Newspapers may refer to:
 Community paper, concept of community papers
Community Newspapers (Wisconsin), an American newspaper group owned by Journal Communications
Community Newspaper Group, Australia
Community Newspapers, Inc., of Athens, Georgia, U.S., publisher of Andrews Journal
Community Newspaper Company, Massachusetts, U.S.
Community Newspaper Holdings, Inc., U.S.